Kurdish nationalist uprisings have periodically occurred in Turkey, beginning with the Turkish War of Independence and the consequent transition from the Ottoman Empire to the modern Turkish state and continuing to the present day with the current PKK–Turkey conflict.

According to Ottoman military records, Kurdish rebellions have been occurring in Anatolia for over two centuries, While large tribal Kurdish revolts had shaken the Ottoman Empire during the last decades of its existence, the modern phase of the conflict is believed to have begun in 1922, with the emergence of Kurdish nationalism which occurred in parallel with the formation of the modern State of Turkey. In 1925, an uprising for an independent Kurdistan, led by Shaikh Said Piran, was quickly put down , and soon afterward, Said and 36 of his followers were executed. Other large-scale Kurdish revolts occurred in Ararat and Dersim in 1930 and 1937. The British consul at Trebizond, the diplomatic post which was closest to Dersim, spoke of brutal and indiscriminate acts of violence and explicitly compared them to the 1915 Armenian genocide. "Thousands of Kurds," he wrote, "including women and children, were slain; others, mostly children, were thrown into the Euphrates; while thousands of others in less hostile areas, who had first been deprived of their cattle and other belongings, were deported to vilayets (provinces) in Central Anatolia. It is now stated that the Kurdish question no longer exists in Turkey."

The Kurds accuse successive Turkish governments of suppressing their identity through such means as the banning of Kurdish languages in print and media. Atatürk believed that the unity and stability of a country both lay in the existence of a unitary political identity, relegating cultural and ethnic distinctions to the private sphere. However, many Kurds did not relinquish their identity and they also did not relinquish their language. Large-scale armed conflict between the Turkish armed forces and the Kurdistan Workers' Party (PKK) occurred throughout the 1980s and 1990s, leaving over 35,000 dead.

Background

The history of Kurdish rebellions against the Ottoman Empire dates back two centuries, but the modern conflict dates back to the abolition of the Caliphate. During the reign of Abdul Hamid II, who was Caliph as well as Sultan, the Kurds were loyal subjects of the Caliph and the establishment of a secular republic after the abolition of the Caliphate in 1924 became a source of widespread resentment. The establishment of the Turkish nationalist state and Turkish citizenship brought an end to the centuries-old millet system, which had unified the Muslim ethnic groups of the Ottoman Empire under a unified Muslim identity. The diverse Muslim ethnic groups of the former Empire were considered Turkish by the newly formed secular Turkish state, which did not recognize an independent Kurdish or Islamic national identity. One of the consequences of these seismic changes was a series of uprisings in Turkey's Kurdish-populated eastern and southeastern regions.

History

Bitlis uprising (1914) 

The Bitlis uprising was a Kurdish uprising in the Ottoman Empire in early 1914. It was supported by the Russian Empire. It was fought concurrently with an unrelated Kurdish uprising in Barzan in the Mosul Vilayet, which was also supported by Russia. Later Kurdish nationalist historiography portrayed the uprising as part of a Kurdish nationalist struggle, but its actual causes laid in opposition to conscription and taxation. The uprising began in early March, with a skirmish between Kurdish fighters and Ottoman gendarmes, where the latter was forced to retreat. The Kurds subsequently laid siege to the city of Bitlis, and captured the city on 2 April. Ottoman forces were then dispatched from Muş and Van and suppressed the uprising. After the defeat of the uprising on 4 April, one of the rebel leaders, Molla Selim, successfully sought asylum in Russia.

Koçgiri rebellion (1920)

The 1920 Koçgiri Rebellion in the overwhelmingly Qizilbash Dersim region, while waged by the Qizilbash Koçkiri tribe, was masterminded by members of an organisation known as the Kürdistan Taâlî Cemiyeti (KTC). This particular rebellion failed for several reasons, most of which have something to do with its Qizilbash character. The fact was that many Dersim tribal chiefs at this point still supported the Kemalists — regarding Mustafa Kemal as their 'protector' against the excesses of Sunni religious zealots, some of whom were Kurmancî Kurds. To most Kurmancî Kurds at the time, the uprising appeared to be merely an Alevi uprising — and thus not in their own interests.  In the aftermath of the Koçkiri rebellion there was talk in the new Turkish Republic's Grand National Assembly of some very limited forms of 'Autonomous Administration' by the Kurds in a Kurdish region centered in Kurdistan. All this disappeared in the 1923 Treaty of Lausanne, however. Bitterly disappointed, the Kurds turned again to armed struggle in 1925 — this time led by the Zaza cleric Sheikh Said, but organized by another, newer, Kurdish nationalist organization, Azadî.

Beytussebab rebellion (1924)

Sheikh Said rebellion (1925)

The main rebellion which dominates the history of the Kurds in Turkey is that of the 1925 rebellion in Kurdistan region of Turkey which was led by Sheikh Said. The repression and aggression of Kemalist secularism followed and all public manifestations of Kurdish identity was outlawed which, in turn, prepared Kurds for more rebellion. The revolt of Sheikh Said began in February 1925. Of almost 15,000 fighters who participated in the rebellion against the 52,000 Turkish Gendarmerie, the main Kurdish tribes participating in the rebellion came from Zaza. The rebellion covered most of the part of Amed (Diyarbakir) and Mardin provinces. The Sheikh Said rebellion was the first large scale rebellion of the Kurdish race movement in Turkey. The main organizer of this rebellion was the Kurdish Independent Society, Azadî. Azadi's intention was to liberate Kurds from Turkish oppression and thus deliver freedom and further, develop their country. By March 1925 the revolt was pretty much over. Sheikh Said and all the other rebel leaders were hanged by June 29.

In Fall of 1927 Sheikh Abdurrahman (brother of Sheikh Said) began a series of attacks on Turkish garrisons in Palu and Malatya. Districts of Lice, Bingöl were captured by the rebels. They also occupied the heights south of Erzurum. Turkish military used air force against the rebels using five airplanes in Mardin. In October 1927, Kurdish rebels attacked and occupied Bayazid. The brother of Sheikh Said tried to exact revenge on the Turkish government by attacking several army bases in Kurdistan. Nothing permanent was accomplished. They were driven out after Turkish reinforcements arrived in the area.

The rebellion failed, however, by 1929, Ihsan Nuri’s movement was in control of a large expanse of Kurdish territory and the revolt was put down by the year 1930.

Ararat rebellion (1927–1930)

The Republic of Ararat was a self-proclaimed Kurdish state. It was located in the east of modern Turkey, being centered on Ağrı Province. The Republic of Ararat was declared independent in 1927, during a wave of rebellion among Kurds in south-eastern Turkey. The rebellion was led by General İhsan Nuri Pasha. However it was not recognized by other states, and lacked foreign support.

By the end of summer 1930, the Turkish Air Force was bombing Kurdish positions around Mount Ararat from all directions. According to General Ihsan Nuri Pasha, the military superiority of Turkish Air Force demoralized Kurds and led to their capitulation. On July 13, the rebellion in Zilan was suppressed. Squadrons of 10–15 aircraft were used in crushing the revolt. On July 16, two Turkish planes were downed and their pilots were killed by the Kurds. Aerial bombardment continued for several days and forced Kurds to withdraw to the height of 5,000 meters. By July 21, bombardment had destroyed many Kurdish forts. During these operations, Turkish military mobilized 66,000 soldiers and 100 aircraft. The campaign against the Kurds was over by September 17, 1930. The Ararat rebellion was defeated in 1931, and Turkey resumed control over the territory.

Government measures after 1937
After suppression of the last rebellion in 1937, Southeast Anatolia was put under martial law. In addition to destruction of villages and massive deportations, Turkish government encouraged Kosovar Albanians and Assyrians to settle in the Kurdish area to change the ethnic composition of the region. The measures taken by the Turkish Army in the immediate aftermath of the revolt became more repressive than previous uprisings. At times, villages and/or buildings were set on fire in order to repress the Kurdish population. In order to prevent the events from having a negative impact on Turkey's International image and reputation, foreigners were not allowed to visit the entire area east of Euphrates until 1965 and the area remained under permanent military siege till 1950. The Kurdish language was banned and the words "Kurds" and "Kurdistan" were removed from dictionaries and history books and Kurds were only referred to as "Mountain Turks".

Kurdish–Turkish conflict (1978–present)

Kurdish ethnic revival appeared in the 1970s when Turkey was racked with left-right clashes and the Marxist PKK was formed demanding a Kurdish state. PKK declared its objective as the liberation of all parts of Kurdistan from colonial oppression and establishment of an independent, united, socialist Kurdish state. It initially attracted the poorer segments of the Kurdish population and became the only Kurdish party not dominated by tribal links. PKK's chairman, Abdullah Öcalan, was proud of being from humble origins.  It characterized its struggle mainly as an anti-colonial one, hence directing its violence against collaborators, i.e., Kurdish tribal chieftains, notables with a stake in the Turkish state, and also against rival organizations. The military coup in 1980 lead to a period of severe repression and elimination of almost all Kurdish and leftist organizations. The PKK, however, was the only Kurdish party that managed to survive and even grow in size after the coup. It initiated a guerrilla offensive with a series of attacks on Turkish military and police stations and due to its daring challenging of the Turkish army, gradually won over grudging admiration of parts of the Kurdish population.  In the beginning of 1990, it had set up its own local administration in some rural areas. Around this time, PKK changed its goals from full Kurdish independence to a negotiated settlement with the Turkish government, specially after some promising indirect contacts with President Turgut Özal. After Özal's sudden death, the Turkish military intensified its operations against PKK bases. These measures succeeded in isolating the PKK from the civilians and reduced it to a guerrilla band operating in the mountains. In 1999, increased Turkish pressure on Syria led to Öcalan's expulsion and ultimate arrest by Turkish Maroon Berets in Kenya. A cooling down occurred, and a ceasefire was brokered in 2014 – but then due to the Siege of Kobane the conflict has restarted.

During the 1980s Turkey began a program of forced assimilation of its Kurdish population. This culminated in 1984 when the PKK began a rebellion against Turkish rule attacking Turkish military. Since the PKK's militant operations began in 1984, 37,000 people have been killed. The PKK has been continuing its guerrilla warfare in the mountains.  As a result, the fighting is limited to approximately 3000 fighters.

Serhildan (1990–present)

The word serhildan describes several Kurdish public rebellions since the 1990s with the slogan "Êdî Bese" ("Enough") against the Turkish government. The first violent action by the populace against police officers and state institutions occurred in 1990 in the Southeast Anatolian town Nusaybin near the border to Syria. The rebellion in Nusaybin is the beginning of the serhildan, during the following days the riots initially widened to other cities of the province Mardin and to the neighboring provinces Batman, Diyarbakır, Siirt, Şanlıurfa and Şırnak, and later to other Eastern Anatolian provinces such as Bingöl, Bitlis, Hakkâri, Muş and Van, as well cities such as Ankara, Istanbul, İzmir and Mersin.

Kurdish political movement

For a long time after the founding of the Turkish Republic and the switch to the parliamentary regime, Kurdish political parties did not exist. After the switch to the multiparty era in 1945 and the beginning of contestation from the Kurdish activist groups against state oppression, a number of underground political parties emerged who believed in armed resistance. A legal and recognized pro-Kurdish party did not come into the political arena until 1990 with the establishment of HEP. The pro-Kurdish voice in Turkey's political arena has been a constant debate throughout several governments and parliamentary settings, with unstable policies in trying to demobilize separatist movements with alleged PKK affiliations. While the PKK does not have a structural relationship or hierarchical control over the HDP, they have aligning political visions, interpersonal and familial ties, and a shared experience of political repression. On the other hand, these ties have heavily fostered the discourse that pro-Kurdish parties "carry terrorists into the parliament" and has influenced not only the legitimacy of these parties but has also shaped campaigning end electoral behaviors of other actors. Another systematic struggle the Kurdish political movement faces is the 10% election threshold. Minority Rights International, a U.K.-based non governmental organization, has stated that the 10% threshold prevents minority parties’ representation in the political arena. Their 2007 report highlights the fact that while pro-Kurdish parties have consistently acquired the highest percentage of votes in areas the Kurdish population is concentrated in, they have failed to reach the national 10% threshold.  It is important to note that a fully ethnocentric Kurdish party has never come into the political arena, Kurdish affiliated parties in the 28 years from HEP to HDP have tried to sustain their existence in Turkish politics via various strategies.

People's Labor Party (HEP)

On 7 June 1990, seven members of the Grand National Assembly of Turkey who were expelled from the Social Democratic People's Party (SHP), together formed the People's Labor Party (HEP) and were led by Ahmet Fehmi Işıklar. The Party was banned in July 1993 by the Constitutional Court of Turkey for promoting separatism. The party was succeeded by the Democracy Party, which was founded in May 1993. The Democracy Party was banned on 16 June 1994 for promoting Kurdish nationalism and four of the party's members: Leyla Zana, Hatip Dicle, Orhan Doğan and Selim Sadak were sentenced to 14 years in prison. Zana was the first Kurdish woman to be elected into parliament. However, she sparked a major controversy by saying, during her inauguration into parliament, "I take this oath for the brotherhood between the Turkish people and the Kurdish people." In June 2004, after spending 10 years in jail, a Turkish court ordered the release of all four prisoners.

People's Democracy Party (HADEP)

In May 1994, Kurdish lawyer Murat Bozlak formed the People's Democracy Party (HADEP), which won 1,171,623 votes, or 4.17% of the national vote during the general elections on 24 December 1995 and 1,482,196 votes or 4.75% in the elections on 18 April 1999, but it failed to win any seats due to the 10% threshold. During local elections in 1999 they won control over 37 municipalities and gained representation in 47 cities and hundreds of districts. In 2002 the party became a member of Socialist International. After surviving a closure case in 1999, HADEP was finally banned on 13 March 2003 on the grounds that it had become a "centre of illegal activities which included aiding and abetting the PKK". The European Court of Human Rights ruled in 2010 that the ban violated article 11 of the European Convention on Human Rights which guarantees freedom of association.

Democratic People's Party (DEHAP) and Democratic Society Movement (DTH)

The Democratic People's Party (DEHAP) was formed on 24 October 1997 and succeeded HADEP. DEHAP won 1,955,298 votes or 6,23% during the November 3, 2002 general election. However, it performed disappointingly during the March 28, 2004 local elections, where their coalition with the SHP and the Freedom and Solidarity Party (ÖDP) only managed to win 5.1% of the vote, only winning in Batman, Hakkâri, Diyarbakır and Şırnak Provinces, the majority of Kurdish voters voting for the AKP. After being released in 2004 Leyla Zana formed the Democratic Society Movement (DTH), which merged with the DEHAP into the Democratic Society Party (DTP) in 2005 under the leadership of Ahmet Türk.

Democratic Society Party (DTP)

The Democratic Society Party decided to run their candidates as independent candidates during the June 22, 2007 general elections, to get around the 10% threshold rule. Independents won 1,822,253 votes or 5.2% during the elections, resulting in a total of 27 seats, 23 of which went to the DTP. The party performed well during the March 29, 2009 local elections, however, winning 2,116,684 votes or 5.41% and doubling the number of governors from four to eight and increasing the number of mayors from 32 to 51. For the first time they won a majority in the southeast and, aside from the Batman, Hakkâri, Diyarbakır and Şırnak provinces which DEHAP had won in 2004, the DTP managed to win Van, Siirt and Iğdır Provinces from the AKP. On 11 December 2009, the Constitutional Court of Turkey voted to ban the DTP, ruling that the party had links to the PKK just like in case of previous closed Kurdish parties and authorities claimed that it is seen as guilty of spreading "terrorist propaganda". Chairman Ahmet Türk and legislator Aysel Tuğluk were expelled from Parliament, and they and 35 other party members were banned from joining any political party for five years. The European Union released a statement, expressing concern over the court's ruling and urging Turkey to change its policies towards political parties. Major protests erupted throughout Kurdish communities in Turkey in response to the ban.

Peace and Democracy Party (BDP)

The DTP was succeeded by the Peace and Democracy Party (BDP), under the leadership of Selahattin Demirtaş. The BDP called on its supporters to boycott the Turkish constitutional referendum on 12 September 2010 because the constitutional change did not meet minority demands. Gültan Kışanak, the BDP co-chair, released a statement saying that "we will not vote against the amendment and prolong the life of the current fascist constitution. Nor will we vote in favour of the amendments and support a new fascist constitution." Due to the boycott Hakkâri (9.05%), Şırnak (22.5%), Diyarbakır (34.8%), Batman (40.62%), Mardin (43.0%), Van (43.61), Siirt (50.88%), Iğdır (51.09%), Muş (54.09%), Ağrı (56.42%), Tunceli (67.22%), Şanlıurfa (68.43%), Kars (68.55%) and Bitlis Province (70.01%) had the lowest turnouts in the country, compared to a 73.71% national average. Tunceli was the only Kurdish majority province where a majority of the population voted "no" during the referendum. During the June 12, 2011 national elections BDP came up with a new strategy to tackle the 10% issue, which brings the question of free representation by requiring that parties need 10% of the vote to be represented in parliament, and formally joined forces with the left, green, and various minority groups to run joint independent candidates, naming this electoral alliance the Labour, Democracy and Freedom Bloc. The BDP nominated 61 independent candidates, winning 2,819,917 votes or 6.57% and increasing its number of seats from 20 to 36. The BDP won the most support in Şırnak (72.87%), Hakkâri (70.87%), Diyarbakır (62.08%) and Mardin (62.08%) Provinces.

Peoples' Democratic Party (HDP) - current

Right after the 2011 Elections in July, in October 2011 the members of the alliance formed the Peoples' Democratic Congress (HDK). Peoples' Democratic Party (HDP) was formed out of the HDK with aims to be represented in parliament. In 2014, parliamentary members of the BDP joined HDP, and the BDP was renamed as Democratic Regions Party (DBP). Having separated from electoral politics, they began organizing for autonomous rule of the region, and a conflict between state security forces and organizers began which ended with almost all DBP officials being arrested. HDP since has been the current agent representing the Kurdish movement in the Turkish political arena, and it unites various political movements pertaining to an array of social minority groups and civil society organizations, which have previously mostly failed to be represented in parliament, to secure a stronger vote.  In the 2015 elections, HDP took a different direction and ran as a party for the first time instead of using the strategy of running independent candidates to avoid falling under the ten per cent electoral threshold for political parties.

See also
Timeline of the Kurdish–Turkish conflict (1978–2015)
Timeline of the Kurdish–Turkish conflict (2015–present)
Kurdistan Region-PKK conflict
RAF Iraq Command
Timeline of Kurdish uprisings
List of modern conflicts in the Middle East
List of conflicts in the Middle East

References

Sources
 
 
 
  (also London: Zed Books, 1992)
 
 

 
Kurdistan independence movement
Kurdish rebellions